MITB or MitB may refer to:

 Man-in-the-browser, an internet security vulnerability
 Man Is the Bastard, a music band
 Money in the Bank ladder match, a professional wrestling ladder match
 WWE Money in the Bank, a professional wrestling pay-per-view featuring the match type
 Master of IT in Business, a master's degree emphasizing the application of information technology
 "Man in the Box", a song by American grunge band Alice in Chains